Nandi Awards for the year 2016 was announced by Andhra Pradesh Government on 14 November 2017 Both Janatha Garage and Sathamanam Bhavati emerged as a big winner by winning 6 awards each for the year.  The NTR National award for the year was conferred upon actor Rajinikanth.

The Awards Ceremony would be held in Amaravati.

Winners list

See also
Nandi Awards of 2015

References

2016
2016 Indian film awards
Lists of Indian award winners